John Lee Guillory (born July 28, 1945) is a former American football defensive back who played for the Cincinnati Bengals in the National Football League (NFL). He played college football at Stanford University. He was also a member of the Oakland Raiders.

References 

1945 births
Living people
American football defensive backs
Stanford Cardinal football players
Cincinnati Bengals players